Ian Christopher Dyson,  (born 26 October 1960) is a retired senior British police officer, having previously been the Commissioner and the Assistant Commissioner of the City of London Police

Early life and education
Dyson was born on 26 October 1960 in Epsom, Surrey, England. He was educated at Kingston Grammar School, then a direct grant grammar school in Kingston upon Thames, London. He studied history at the University of Leeds, graduating with a Bachelor of Arts (BA) degree.

Police career
Dyson began his police career in 1983 with the Metropolitan Police. He served in that force until 2008, when he moved to Surrey Police as an Assistant Chief Constable. In 2010, he then moved to the City of London Police as Commander, being promoted to Assistant Commissioner in 2012. He was appointed Commissioner of the City of London Police effective 1 January 2016. In May of 2021, Dyson announced his retirement and was succeeded by Commissioner Angela McLaren who took up her post on 3 January 2022.

Honours

In 2022, he was commissioned as Deputy Lieutenant (DL) of Greater London.

References

 

 

Commissioners of the City of London Police
Metropolitan Police officers
British police chief officers
English recipients of the Queen's Police Medal
Living people
1960 births
People from Epsom
People educated at Kingston Grammar School
Deputy Lieutenants of Greater London